Fleshbot is a sex-oriented weblog, founded by Gawker Media. It was launched in November 2003 as the third online title from Gawker. The range of subject matter includes everything from amateur sex blogs and thumbnail gallery posts to news about sex in popular culture and advertising. The blog covers both heterosexual and homosexual erotica and users have the ability to filter between the two if they choose.

Fleshbot was previously edited by Lux Alptraum, who owned the site from 2012. In February 2014, Fleshbot was purchased by SK Intertainment from Lux Alptraum. It was announced that Alptraum would remain with Fleshbot as a contributing editor.

References

External links
 

Internet properties established in 2003
Gawker Media
American erotica and pornography websites